Hindarx (also, Hindarkh) is a village and the most populous municipality, except the capital Aghjabadi, in the Aghjabadi District of Azerbaijan. It has a population of 16,998.

References 

Populated places in Aghjabadi District